2009 Pakistan Army Mil Mi-17 crash
2015 Pakistan Army Mil Mi-17 crash